The fineness of a precious metal object (coin, bar, jewelry, etc.) represents the weight of fine metal therein, in proportion to the total weight which includes alloying base metals and any impurities. Alloy metals are added to increase hardness and durability of coins and jewelry, alter colors, decrease the cost per weight, or avoid the cost of high-purity refinement. For example, copper is added to the precious metal silver to make a more durable alloy for use in coins, housewares and jewelry. Coin silver, which was used for making silver coins in the past, contains 90% silver and 10% copper, by mass. Sterling silver contains 92.5% silver and 7.5% of other metals, usually copper, by mass.

Various ways of expressing fineness have been used and two remain in common use: millesimal fineness expressed in units of parts per 1,000 and karats or carats used only for gold. Karats measure the parts per 24, so that 18 karat =  = 75% and 24 karat gold is considered 100% gold.

Millesimal fineness
Millesimal fineness is a system of denoting the purity of platinum, gold and silver alloys by parts per thousand of pure metal by mass in the alloy. For example, an alloy containing 75% gold is denoted as "750". Many European countries use decimal hallmark stamps (i.e., "585", "750", etc.) rather than "14K", "18K", etc., which is used in the United Kingdom and United States.

It is an extension of the older karat system of denoting the purity of gold by fractions of 24, such as "18 karat" for an alloy with 75% (18 parts per 24) pure gold by mass.

The millesimal fineness is usually rounded to a three figure number, particularly where used as a hallmark, and the fineness may vary slightly from the traditional versions of purity.

Here are the most common millesimal finenesses used for precious metals and the most common terms associated with them.

Platinum
 999.5: what most dealers would buy as if 100% pure; the most common purity for platinum bullion coins and bars
 999—three nines fine
 950: the most common purity for platinum jewelry
 925
 900—one nine fine
 850
 750

Gold

 999.999—six nines fine: The purest gold ever produced. Refined by the Perth Mint in 1957.
 999.99—five nines fine: The purest type of gold currently produced; the Royal Canadian Mint regularly produces commemorative coins in this fineness, including the world's largest at 100 kg.
 999.9—four nines fine: Most popular. E.g. ordinary Canadian Gold Maple Leaf and American Buffalo coins
 999—24 karat, also occasionally known as three nines fine: e.g., Chinese Gold Panda coins
 995: The minimum allowed in Good Delivery gold bars
 990—two nines fine
 986—Ducat fineness: Formerly used by Venetian and Holy Roman Empire mints; still in use in Austria and Hungary
 958.3—23 karat
 916—22 karat: Crown gold. Historically the most widely used fineness for gold bullion coins, such as the oldest American Eagle denominations from 1795–1833.  Currently used for British Sovereigns, South African Krugerrands, and the modern (1986—present) American Gold Eagles.
 900—one nine fine: American Eagle denominations for 1837–1933; currently used in Latin Monetary Union mintage (e.g. French and Swiss "Napoleon coin" 20 francs)
 899—American Eagles briefly for 1834—1836
 834—20 karat
 750—18 karat: In Spain "oro de primera ley"  (first law gold)
 625—15 karat
 585—14 karat
 583.3—14 karat: In Spain "oro de segunda ley" (second law gold)
 500—12 karat
 417—10 karat: Lowest legal solid gold karat made in USA
 375—9 karat
 333—8 karat: Minimum standard for gold in Germany after 1884

Silver

 999.99—five nines fine: The purest silver ever produced. This was achieved by the Royal Silver Company of Bolivia.
 999.9—four nines fine: ultra-fine silver used by the Royal Canadian Mint for their Silver Maple Leaf and other silver coins
 999—fine silver or three nines fine: used in Good Delivery bullion bars and most current silver bullion coins.  Used in U.S. silver commemorative coins and silver proof coins starting in 2019.
 980: common standard used in Mexico ca. 1930–45
 958: Britannia silver
 950: French 1st Standard
 947.9: 91 zolotnik Russian silver
 935: Swiss standard for watchcases after 1887, to meet the British Merchandise Marks Act and to be of equal grade to 925 Sterling. Sometimes claimed to have arisen as a Swiss misunderstanding of the standard required for British Sterling. Usually marked with three Swiss bears.
 935: used in the Art Deco period in Austria and Germany. Scandinavian silver jewellers used 935 silver after the 2nd World War
 925: Sterling silver The UK has used this alloy from the early 12th century. Equivalent to "plata de primera ley" in Spain (first law silver)
 917: a standard used for the minting of Indian silver (rupees), during the British raj and for some coins during the first Brazilian Republic.
 916: 88 zolotnik Russian silver
 900: one nine fine, coin-silver , or 90% silver: e.g. Flowing Hair and 1837–1964 U.S. silver coins.  Also used in U.S. silver commemorative coins and silver proof coins 1982–2018.
 892.4:  US coinage  fine "standard silver" as defined by the Coinage Act of 1792: e.g. Draped Bust and Capped Bust U.S. silver coins (1795–1836)
 875: 84 zolotnik is the most common fineness for Russian silver. Swiss standard, commonly used for export watchcases (also 800 and later 935).
 835: a standard predominantly used in Germany after 1884, and for some Dutch silver; and for the minting of coins in countries of the Latin Monetary Union
 833: a common standard for continental silver especially among the Dutch, Swedish, and Germans
 830: a common standard used in older Scandinavian silver
 800: the minimum standard for silver in Germany after 1884; the French 2nd standard for silver; "plata de segunda ley" in Spain (second law silver); Egyptian silver; Canadian silver circulating coinage from 1920-1966/7
 750: an uncommon silver standard found in older German, Swiss and Austro-Hungarian silver
 720: Decoplata :many Mexican and Dutch silver coins use this standard, as well as some coins from Portugal's former colonies, Japan, Uruguay, Ecuador, Egypt, and Morocco.
 600: Used in some examples of postwar Japanese coins, such as the 1957-1966 100 yen coin
 500: Standard used for making British coinage 1920–1946 as well as Canadian coins from 1967-1968, and some coins from Colombia and Brazil.
 400: Standard used for US half dollars between 1965 and 1970, and commemorative issue Eisenhower dollars between 1971 and 1978. Also used in some Swedish Krona coins.
 350: Standard used for US Jefferson 'War Nickels' minted between 1942 and 1945.

Karat

The karat (US spelling, symbol K or kt) or carat (UK spelling, symbol C or ct) is a fractional measure of purity for gold alloys, in parts fine per 24 parts whole. The karat system is a standard adopted by US federal law.

Mass 

K = 24 × Mg / Mm

where

 K is the karat rating of the material,
 Mg is the mass of pure gold in the alloy, and
 Mm is the total mass of the material.

24-karat gold is pure (while 100% purity is unattainable, this designation is permitted in commerce for 99.95% purity), 18-karat gold is 18 parts gold, 6 parts another metal (forming an alloy with 75% gold), 12-karat gold is 12 parts gold (12 parts another metal), and so forth.

In England, the carat was divisible into four grains, and the grain was divisible into four quarts. For example, a gold alloy of  fineness (that is, 99.2% purity) could have been described as being 23-karat, 3-grain, 1-quart gold.

The karat fractional system is increasingly being complemented or superseded by the millesimal system, described above.

Conversion between percentage of pure gold and karats:
 58.33–62.50% = 14K (acclaimed 58.33%)
 75.00–79.16% = 18K (acclaimed 75.00%)
 91.66–95.83% = 22K (acclaimed 91.66%)
 95.83–99.95% = 23K (acclaimed 95.83%)
 99.95–100% = 24K (acclaimed 99.95%)

Volume
However, this system of calculation gives only the mass of pure gold contained in an alloy. The term 18-karat gold means that the alloy's mass consists of 75% of gold and 25% of other metal(s). The quantity of gold by volume in a less-than-24-karat gold alloy differs according to the alloy(s) used. For example, knowing that standard 18-karat yellow gold consists of 75% gold, 12.5% silver and the remaining 12.5% of copper (all by mass), the volume of pure gold in this alloy will be 60% since gold is much denser than the other metals used: 19.32 g/cm3 for gold, 10.49 g/cm3 for silver and 8.96 g/cm3 for copper.

This formula gives the amount of gold in cubic centimeters or in milliliters in an alloy:

 
where
 VAu is the volume of gold in cubic centimeters or in milliliters,
 Ma is the total mass of the alloy in grams, and
 kt is the karat purity of the alloy.

To have the percentage of the volume of gold in an alloy, divide the volume of gold in cubic centimetres or in millilitres by the total volume of the alloy in cubic centimetres or in millilitres.

For 10-carat gold, the gold volume in the alloy represents about 26% of the total volume for standard yellow gold. Talking about purity according to mass could lead to some misunderstandings; for many people, purity means volume.

Etymology

Karat is a variant of carat. First attested in English in the mid-15th century, the word carat came from Middle French , in turn derived either from Italian  or Medieval Latin . These were borrowed into Medieval Europe from the Arabic  meaning "fruit of the carob tree", also "weight of 5 grains", and was a unit of mass though it was probably not used to measure gold in classical times. The Arabic term ultimately originates from the Greek  meaning carob seed (literally "small horn")  (diminutive of  – , "horn").

This is believed to be the origin of the value of the karat.

Verifying fineness
While there are many methods of detecting fake precious metals, there are realistically only two options available for verifying the marked fineness of metal as being reasonably accurate: assaying the metal (which requires destroying it), or using X-ray fluorescence (XRF). XRF will measure only the outermost portion of the piece of metal and so may get misled by thick plating.

That becomes a concern because it would be possible for an unscrupulous refiner to produce precious metals bars that are slightly less pure than marked on the bar. A refiner doing $1 billion of business each year that marked .980 pure bars as .999 fine would make about an extra $20 million in profit. In the United States, the actual purity of gold articles must be no more than .003 less than the marked purity (e.g. .996 fine for gold marked .999 fine), and the actual purity of silver articles must be no more than .004 less than the marked purity.

Fine weight
A piece of alloy metal containing a precious metal may also have the weight of its precious component referred to as its "fine weight". For example, 1 troy ounce of 18 karat gold (which is 75% gold) may be said to have a fine weight of 0.75 troy ounces.

Most modern government-issued bullion coins specify their fine weight. For example, the American Gold Eagle is embossed One Oz. Fine Gold and weighs 1.091 Troy oz.

Troy mass of silver content
Fineness of silver in Britain was traditionally expressed as the mass of silver expressed in troy ounces and pennyweights ( troy ounce) in one troy pound (12 troy ounces) of the resulting alloy. Britannia silver has a fineness of 11 ounces, 10 pennyweights, or about  silver, whereas sterling silver has a fineness of 11 ounces, 2 pennyweights, or exactly  silver.

See also
 Colored gold
 Electrum
 Gold as an investment
 Gold coin
 Platinum coin
 Silver as an investment
 Silver coin
 Tumbaga

References

External links

 

Metallurgy
Gold investments
Precious metals
Units of purity
Jewellery making

es:Ley (pureza)